Death of a Cheerleader is a television film that aired on Lifetime on February 2, 2019 and starring Aubrey Peeples, Morgan Taylor Campbell, Sarah Dugdale, Madelyn Grace, Mackenzie Cardwell, and Kellie Martin. The film is a remake of the 1994 television film A Friend to Die For, based on the murder of Kirsten Costas, and has Martin appearing in a different role than in the 1994 version.

Plot

In the fictional town of Colina, California, Bridget Moretti is a shy student attending Hollybrook High. She wants to be popular by befriending rich and pretty Kelly Locke who leads the school's most prestigious group, the Bobettes. After being accepted into the group, Bridget tries to further her popularity by trying out as a cheerleader and applying for a yearbook staff position, but is devastated after being passed up for both.

Undeterred despite these setbacks, Bridget calls Kelly's mom one night, relaying information about there supposedly being a special dinner for the Bobettes, which is actually a ruse to get Kelly out of the house, under the guise of going to a college party. When Kelly rejects Bridget's overtures, it fills her with rage; after fleeing Bridget's car, Kelly gets a ride home from a nearby resident, but Bridget follows the vehicle back to Kelly's house and fatally stabs her to death immediately after she is dropped off.

After Kelly is later found dead, this attracts the attention of FBI Agent Murray, who investigates Kelly's murder; fellow student and "punk girl" Nina Miller (who also serves as the narrator) is initially a suspect, due to her having words with Kelly and having lied to her mother about going out with her boyfriend the night of Kelly's murder, but is later cleared. Eventually, consumed by guilt, Bridget writes a letter of confession to her mother and turns herself in.

Cast
 Aubrey Peeples as Bridget Moretti
 Morgan Taylor Campbell as Nina Miller
 Sarah Dugdale as Kelly Locke
 Madelyn Grace as Trish Doyle
 Mackenzie Cardwell as Judy
 Kellie Martin as Agent Murray
 Kirsten Robek as Betty Locke
 Lane Edwards as Dale Locke
 P. Lynn Johnson as Margo Moretti
 Milo Shandel as Principal Simmons
 Alison Rayne as Mia Miller
 Lucia Walters as Mrs. Lockwood

References

External links
 Death of a Cheerleader at Lifetime
 

Remakes of American films
Lifetime (TV network) films
2019 television films
2019 films
Cheerleading films
Films set in 1983
Films set in 1984
Films set in 1985